Daniel López Ramos (born 24 November 1976) is a Spanish former footballer who played as a central defender.

Club career
Born in Jerez de la Frontera, Province of Cádiz, López Ramos played 308 Segunda División matches over ten seasons in representation of five clubs, mainly Córdoba CF.

He retired in June 2011 at nearly 35, after one year in Segunda División B with Real Oviedo.

External links

1976 births
Living people
Footballers from Jerez de la Frontera
Spanish footballers
Association football defenders
Segunda División players
Segunda División B players
Xerez CD footballers
Córdoba CF players
Polideportivo Ejido footballers
UD Las Palmas players
Albacete Balompié players
Real Oviedo players